Richard Lewis Scott (March 15, 1933 – February 10, 2020) was a pitcher in Major League Baseball. He pitched in 12 games for the Los Angeles Dodgers and Chicago Cubs in 1963–64.

Career
On August 18, 1953, Dick Scott signed as an amateur free agent with the Brooklyn Dodgers. Dick Scott began his career in 1963 at the age of thirty with the Los Angeles Dodgers. Scott wore number 20 during his time there. On December 13, 1963, he was traded by the Dodgers to the Chicago Cubs in exchange for Jim Brewer and Cuno Barragan. He played with the Chicago Cubs for the 1964 season, where he wore the number 38.

Personal life
He did not attend college.

Scott died February 10, 2020.

References

External links

Major League Baseball pitchers
Los Angeles Dodgers players
Chicago Cubs players
Great Falls Electrics players
Thomasville Dodgers players
Pueblo Dodgers players
St. Paul Saints (AA) players
Macon Dodgers players
Spokane Indians players
Victoria Rosebuds players
Montreal Royals players
Atlanta Crackers players
Omaha Dodgers players
Salt Lake City Bees players
Baseball players from New Hampshire
1933 births
2020 deaths
American expatriate baseball players in Nicaragua